Heber Edgar Smith (8 August 1915 – 25 October 1990) was a Progressive Conservative party member of the House of Commons of Canada. He was born in Tiny, Ontario and became a barrister and lawyer by career.

He was first elected at the Simcoe North riding in the 1957 general election, then re-elected there in 1958, 1962, 1963 and 1965. After completing his final term, the 27th Canadian Parliament, Smith did not seek re-election and left federal politics in 1968.

External links
 

1915 births
1990 deaths
Members of the House of Commons of Canada from Ontario
Progressive Conservative Party of Canada MPs
Lawyers in Ontario
20th-century Canadian lawyers